Warren's Mill is a historic grist mill located near Millsboro, Sussex County, Delaware. The mill was built in 1910–18, and is a large two-story, large, rectangular, frame structure sheathed in clapboard and with a gambrel roof. It sits on a poured concrete foundation and has a concrete spillway.  Also on the property is a contributing shed frame, with clapboard siding and a shingled gable roof.

It was added to the National Register of Historic Places in 1978.

References

Grinding mills in Delaware
Grinding mills on the National Register of Historic Places in Delaware
Industrial buildings completed in 1918
Buildings and structures in Sussex County, Delaware
National Register of Historic Places in Sussex County, Delaware